Marie Louise Nignan-Bassolet is a Burkinabé politician. 

She served as Minister of Justice in 1982-1983.  She was the first woman Minister of Justice in her country.

References

Government ministers of Burkina Faso
20th-century women politicians
Women government ministers of Burkina Faso